Burj Jumeirah is a cancelled Observation tower project near Burj Al Arab in Sufouh district of Dubai. It was initially expected to be completed in 2023. As of January 2022, construction hasn't began and all references to the tower have been removed from the developer's website.

At the base of the tower and the surrounding area, large spaces will be available to accommodate large numbers of the public and ensure a distinctive interactive atmosphere for visitors. The region will also offer many options for retail outlets including shops, restaurants, and cinemas along the perimeter of the tower.

References

Unbuilt buildings and structures in Dubai
Architecture in Dubai
High-tech architecture